The Bellerophontidae are an extinct family of specialized globose bellerophontids, Paleozoic and early Triassic mollusks of the class Gastropoda.

Geological range
These mollusks appeared in the Late Cambrian and continued until the Early Triassic.

Shell description
The shell resembles a miniature Nautilus, with greatly overlapping, rounded whorls, in which the last whorl completely encompasses the others, leaving either a very narrow umbilicus on either side, or none at all.  At the aperture of the shell is a slit, which results in a sort of low ridge that runs along the length of shell.  The shell has a low profile and these possibly were active, fast-moving molluscs.

Taxonomy

1960 taxonomy 
Knight et al. 1960 in the Treatise on Invertebrate Paleontology consider the Bellerophontidae a very large family made up of a number of subfamilies and tribes.

The 1960 classification places the family Bellerophontidae in the order Bellerophontida Ulrich & Scofield, 1897.

The classification presented is:

Order Bellerophontida Ulrich & Scofield, 1897
 Family Bellerophontidae McCoy, 1851
 Subfamily Tropidodiscinae  Knight, 1956
 Subfamily Bucaniinae Ulrich & Scofield, 1897
 Tribe Bucaniides Ulrich & Scofield, 1897
 Tribe Salpingostomatides Koken, 1925
 Subfamily Carinaropsinae Ulrich & Scofield, 1897
 Subfamily Pterothecinae Wenz, 1938
 Subfamily Bellerophontinae McCoy, 1851
 Subfamily Knightitinae Knight, 1956

2001 taxonomy 
Recently, Peter J. Wagner presented cladograms which divide this assemblage into a number of different groups, as well as combining the Bellerophontidae with the family Sinuitidae. while Bouchet & Rocroi (2005) places Sinuitidae as a family in superfamily Bellerophontoidea.

2005 taxonomy 
The taxonomy of the Gastropoda by Bouchet & Rocroi, 2005 categorizes Bellerophontidae like this:

 Paleozoic molluscs of uncertain systematic position
 Paleozoic molluscs with isostrophically coiled shells of uncertain position within Mollusca (Gastropoda or Monoplacophora)
 superfamily Bellerophontoidea McCoy, 1852 - Bellerophontoidea is the only superfamily in this taxon.
 family Bellerophontidae McCoy, 1852
 subfamily Bellerophontinae McCoy, 1852 - synonym: Liljevallospiridae Golikov & Starobogatov, 1889
 subfamily Bucanopsinae Wahlman, 1992
 subfamily Cymbulariinae Horný, 1963 
 subfamily Knightitinae Knight, 1956

Bouchet & Rocroi, on page 271 (2005), also state that the assignation of "symmetrical univalved mollusks "bellerophonts" either to Gastropoda or to Monoplacophora or Tergomya is controversial." In other words, it is not yet certain whether bellerophonts are in fact real gastropods, they might be monoplacophorans or they might belong to a group (Tergomya) that is closely related to the gastropods, but not actually gastropods.

Genera 
Genera in the family Bellerophontidae include:

 subfamily Bellerophontinae
 genus Bellerophon Montfort, 1808 - type genus of the subfamily Bellerophontinae
 subfamily Bucanopsinae
 genus Bucanopsis Ulrich, 1897 - type genus of the subfamily Bucanopsinae
 subfamily Cymbulariinae
 genus Cymbularia Koken, 1896 - type genus of the subfamily Cymbulariinae
 subfamily Knightitinae
 genus Knightites Moore, 1941 - type genus of the subfamily Knightitinae

other genera include:
 Aglaoglypta
 Liljevallospira
 Pharkidonotus
 Prosoptychus
 Ptychobellerophon
 Ptychosphaera

References

Further reading 
 Linsley, R. M. 1978. Locomotion rates and shell form in the gastropoda. Malacologia 17, 193-206 
 Moore, R.C., Lalicker, C.G., and Fischer, A. G., (1952), Invertebrate Fossils, McGraw Hill Book Company, New York; 766 pp. 
 ----- [no date]. Systematic Paleontology of the Earliest Gastropods (Including Family and Genus Level Stratigraphic Ranges and Synonyms

External links

 Bellerophontida - Palaeos

 
Prehistoric mollusc families
Early Triassic extinctions

pl:Belerofony